The Waipori River is in Otago in the South Island of New Zealand. Google Maps erroneously shows the stretch of Taieri river from the confluence to the mouth as Waipori River. The correct name is shown on the New Zealand government's official NZ Topo Map.

The upper reaches of the Waipori flow through rough hill country, much of it covered by the Berwick Forest. An artificial lake, Lake Mahinerangi is formed on the river behind a small hydroelectric station at Waipori Falls, which was built in 1880 to provide power for the city of Dunedin. Much of this area is within the Waipori Falls Scenic Reserve.

The lower reaches of the river pass through an area of wetlands around Lakes Waihola and Waipori, both of which drain into the river. This area is a habitat for many species of wading birds. The Sinclair Wetlands reserve is located in this area.

The name Waipori comes from Māori words meaning "dark water".

Notes

Rivers of Otago
Rivers of New Zealand
Taieri River